Nikita Vladimirovich Fursin (born 9 March 1983) is a former Russian professional footballer.

Club career
He played in the Russian Football National League for FC Tyumen in 2014.

External links
 
 

1983 births
People from Oboyansky District
Living people
Russian footballers
Association football defenders
FC Mostransgaz Gazoprovod players
FC Salyut Belgorod players
FC Mika players
FC Granit Mikashevichi players
FC Belshina Bobruisk players
FC Torpedo-BelAZ Zhodino players
FC Tyumen players
FC Fakel Voronezh players
FC Oryol players
FC Avangard Kursk players
FC Neftekhimik Nizhnekamsk players
Armenian Premier League players
Belarusian Premier League players
Russian expatriate footballers
Expatriate footballers in Armenia
Expatriate footballers in Belarus
Sportspeople from Kursk Oblast